Byttneria sparrei is a species of flowering plant in the family Malvaceae. It is found only in Ecuador. Its natural habitat is subtropical or tropical dry shrubland.

References

sparrei
Endemic flora of Ecuador
Vulnerable plants
Taxonomy articles created by Polbot